Lucien Génin (9 November 1894 in Rouen – 26 August 1953 in Paris) was a French painter in the milieu of pre-World War I, and 1920s Montmartre and Saint-Germain-des-Prés.

References

1894 births
1953 deaths
20th-century French painters
20th-century French male artists
French male painters
Artists from Rouen
19th-century French male artists